James Garrison may refer to:
 James Garrison (architect) (born 1953), American architect and educator
 James R. Garrison (1838 –1908), Union Navy sailor and Medal of Honor recipient
 James D. Garrison, American historian of literature
 Jim Garrison (1921–1992), Louisiana district attorney, known for his investigations into the assassination of President John F. Kennedy
 Jim Garrison (American football) (1933–2015), American football coach
 Jimmy Garrison (1934–1976), American jazz double bassist